The 1988 FAI Cup Final was the final match of the 1987–88 FAI Cup, a knock-out association football competition contested annually by clubs affiliated with the Football Association of Ireland. It took place on Sunday 1 May 1988 at Dalymount Park in Dublin, and was contested by Dundalk and Derry City. Dundalk won the match 1–0 to win the cup for the eighth time, and, in so doing, won their second League and Cup Double.

Background
The two sides' three previous meetings that season had been in the League, with Dundalk winning both matches in Oriel Park and Derry winning the match in the Brandywell. Dundalk had already been confirmed League of Ireland Champions for 1987–88, and they were chasing their second League and Cup Double. They had lost the previous season's final and hadn't won the Cup since 1981. To reach the final they had defeated Sligo Rovers (3–2 in a replay after a 1–1 draw), Bray Wanderers (2–0), Cork City (1–0 in a replay after a 0–0 draw), and St Patrick's Athletic (4–0 on aggregate in a two-leg semi-final).

Derry City had joined the League in 1985–86, and been promoted in 1986–87. They finished eighth in the Premier Division in their first season, and were playing in their first FAI Cup final, but had already qualified for the 1988–89 European Cup Winners' Cup due to Dundalk qualifying for the 1988–89 European Cup. They had overcome non-league St Joseph's Boys (6–0), Bohemians (4–1 in a replay after a 0–0 draw), Home Farm (3–0), and Longford Town (6–2 on aggregate in a two-leg semi-final) to reach the final.

The match was broadcast live on RTÉ Two in Ireland with commentary from George Hamilton.

Match

Summary
The match, spoiled somewhat by a strong blustery wind and a cut-up pitch, was settled by a controversial 20th-minute penalty, scored by John Cleary. Derry's Martin Bayly had been harshly adjudged to have fouled Dundalk's Larry Wyse by referee Spillane, when Bayly pushed Wyse on the right-hand side of the penalty area but not with enough force to knock him over. Derry City had two claims for penalties of their own waved away in the second half, but on the balance of play Dundalk were considered to have been the better team, generally snuffing out Derry City's attacking play and creating a number of good chances of their own. Dundalk's victory meant that they had secured their second League and Cup Double, the first having been won in 1978–79.

Details

References
Bibliography

Citations

External links
RTE's full match coverage on YouTube

See also
 Derry City F.C.
 List of Derry City F.C. seasons
 Dundalk F.C.
 History of Dundalk F.C.
 List of Dundalk F.C. seasons
 List of Dundalk F.C. records and statistics

FAI Cup finals
Fai Cup Final 1988
Fai Cup Final 1988
FAI Cup Final, 1988
FAI Cup Final